Epina is a genus of moths of the family Crambidae.

Species
Epina alleni (Fernald, 1888)
Epina dichromella (Walker, 1866)

References

Chiloini
Crambidae genera
Taxa named by Francis Walker (entomologist)